Witchery is an Australian fashion label specialising in women's clothing, shoes and accessories. Part of the Country Road Group, Witchery operates stores across mainland Australia, New Zealand and concession stores in both David Jones and Woolworths South Africa.
Based in Burnley, Victoria, Australia, the company has its flagship store located at Chadstone Shopping Centre, a suburb of Melbourne, Australia. The company is a supporter for Ovarian Cancer Australia.

Acquisition 
In 2012, Country Road purchased Witchery Group for $172 million. The takeover created one of Australia's biggest speciality apparel retailers, with 517 stores and $679 million in annual sales.

References

External links 
 Witchery

Clothing retailers of Australia
Clothing brands of Australia
Australian brands
Australian subsidiaries of foreign companies
Companies based in Melbourne